The 2010 FINA Diving World Cup presented a new event in the sport of diving which is team event. This event replaced the traditional men and women's 1 metre springboard. The team event was contested on June 2, the first day of  the 2010 FINA Diving World Cup.

Results

Green denotes finalists

2010 FINA Diving World Cup